Pyhäranta is a municipality of Finland. It is located in the province of Western Finland and is part of the Southwest Finland region.

The municipality is unilingually Finnish. According to Traficom, Pyhäranta is the third most motorized municipality in Finland with 650 cars per thousand inhabitants.

References

External links

Municipality of Pyhäranta – Official website

Municipalities of Southwest Finland
Populated coastal places in Finland